SVU may refer to:

Places
 Savusavu Airport, an airport in Savusavu, Fiji  (IATA: SVU, ICAO: NFNS)

Arts, entertainment, and media
 Law & Order: Special Victims Unit (or Law & Order: SVU), an American police procedural TV series set in New York City 
 Standard Value Unit, the universal currency in the Demon Princes sci-fi pentalogy
 Sweet Valley University, a fictional university in the Sweet Valley High book series

Universities
 Shri Venkateshwara University, Uttar Pradesh, India
 Silicon Valley University, San Jose, California, U.S.
 South Valley University, Egypt
 Southern Virginia University, Buena Vista, Virginia, U.S.
 Sri Venkateswara University, Andhra Pradesh, India
 Syrian Virtual University, Syria

Other uses
 Czechoslovak Society of Arts and Sciences, a nonprofit, nonpolitical, cultural organization
 Dragunov SVU, a Russian sniper rifle
 Special Victims Unit, a specialized division within some police departments
 SuperValu (United States) (NYSE ticker symbol), a United States grocery retailer and distributor

See also
SUV (disambiguation)